Valentina Uccheddu (born 26 October 1966 in Oristano) is a retired Italian long jumper.

She briefly held the Italian record with 6.80 metres from Sestriere in 1994, but the same year Fiona May became an Italian citizen. May would later improve the Italian record to 7.11 m.

International competitions

National titles
Valentina Uccheddu has won six times individually at the national championships.
4 wins in long jump (1991, 1992, 1995, 1999)
2 wins in long jump indoor (1991, 1999)

See also
 Italian record progression women's long jump
 Italian all-time top lists - Long jump

References

External links
 

1966 births
Living people
People from Oristano
Italian female long jumpers
Olympic athletes of Italy
Athletes (track and field) at the 1992 Summer Olympics
World Athletics Championships athletes for Italy
Sportspeople from Sardinia
Mediterranean Games silver medalists for Italy
Athletes (track and field) at the 1991 Mediterranean Games
Mediterranean Games medalists in athletics
Sardinian women
20th-century Italian women